Covelo is a former civil parish in the municipality of Gondomar, Portugal. In 2013, the parish merged into the new parish Foz do Sousa e Covelo. It has a population of 1,755 inhabitants and a total area of 8.36 km2.

References

Former parishes of Gondomar, Portugal